Rödl or Roedl is a German surname. Notable people with the surname include:

Arthur Rödl (1898–1945), German Nazi SS commandant of the Gross-Rosen concentration camp
Georg Karl Rödl (1905–1964), German sculptor
Ludwig Rödl (1907–1970), German chess master
Henrik Rödl (born 1969), German basketball player
Vojtěch Rödl, mathematician
Sebastian Rödl, German professor of philosophy

The name may also refer to Rödl & Partner, a multidisciplinary professional services firm of German origin. 

German-language surnames